Abdel Khlik Abou El-Yazi (born 2 March 1966) is an Egyptian field hockey player. He competed in the 1992 Summer Olympics.

References

External links
 

1966 births
Living people
Field hockey players at the 1992 Summer Olympics
Egyptian male field hockey players
Olympic field hockey players of Egypt